Kenneth Tarleton (30 October 1900 – December 1984) was a rugby union player who represented Australia.

Tarleton, a hooker, was born in North Sydney, New South Wales and claimed a total of 2 international rugby caps for Australia.

References

Australian rugby union players
Australia international rugby union players
1900 births
1984 deaths
Rugby union players from Sydney
Rugby union hookers